Tax and Customs Service is the customs service of the Republic of Poland and is the uniformed and armed law enforcement agency component within the National Revenue Administration, operating its own tactical units, subordinate to the Polish Ministry of Finance. In its current form,  it was established in 2017 by merging the pre-existing Polish Customs Service, created in 1999 from the reformed Central Customs Office until 1953 known as Central Board of Customs, with the fiscal control (and intelligence) service, and incorporating it together with the tax administration into the newly established KAS umbrella structure. It is responsible for assessing and collecting customs duties and excise, exercising customs control, primarily at the Poland's borders, the entire tax intelligence, targeted fiscal inspections, supervision of legal and combatting illegal gambling, as well as exercising tasks related to tax, customs and illegal gambling investigations (directed by a public prosecutor) in criminal cases, including tactical operations.

Ranks and rank insignia

The Polish government decided in 2009 that the customs service rank structure would be adapted to the rank structure of the Police and Border Guard.

 :
  ,
  ;
 :
  ,
  ,
  ,
  ,
  ,
  ;
 :
  ,
  ,
  ;
 :
  ,
  ,
  ;
 :
  ,
  ,
  ;
 :
  ,
  .

Central Board of Customs executives
 1 January 1946 – 30 September 1947 Kazimierz Siewierski
 1 October 1947 – 30 June 1952 Zygmunt Czyżewski
 1 July 1952 – 15 December 1953 Witold Tryuk (acting)

Central Customs Office executives
 16 December 1953 – 31 August 1969 Józef Konarzewski
 1 September 1969 – 31 January 1972 Tomasz Antoniewicz
 1 February 1972 – 15 November 1977 Jarosław Nowicki
 16 November 1977 – 29 February 1980 Eugeniusz Dostojewski
 1 March 1980 – 30 April 1985 Kazimierz Prośniak
 15 August 1985 – 31 January 1990 Jerzy Ćwiek
 1 February 1990 – 21 February 1991 Tomasz Bartoszewicz
 22 February 1991 – 24 March 1991 Krzysztof Hordyński (acting)
 25 March 1991 – 20 August 1993 Mirosław Zieliński
 23 August 1993 – 11 December 1993 Mariusz Jakubowski (acting)
 11 December 1993 – 16 March 1995 Ireneusz Sekuła
 16 March 1995 – 29 June 1995 Lech Kacperski (acting)
 30 June 1995 – 30 June 1997 Mieczysław Nogaj
 30 June 1997 – 7 January 1998 Tomasz Cecelski (acting)
 7 January 1998 – 12 May 1999 Janusz Paczocha
 13 May 1999 – 5 December 2001 Zbigniew Bujak
 5 December 2001 – 30 April 2002 Tomasz Michalak

Customs Service executives
 1 May 2002 – 17 January 2003 Tomasz Michalak
 17 January 2003 – 23 February 2004 Robert Kwaśniak
 24 February 2004 – 28 November 2005 Wiesław Czyżowicz
 28 November 2005 – 2 January 2008 Marian Banaś
 3 January 2008 – 1 February 2008 Jacek Dominik
 1 February 2008 – 19 November 2015 Jacek Kapica
 19 November 2015 – 28 February 2017 Marian Banaś

National Revenue Administration executives
 1 March 2017 – 4 June 2019 Marian Banaś
 4 June 2019 – 12 June 2019 Paweł Cybulski (acting)
 12 June 2019 – 2 March 2020 Piotr Walczak
 3 March 2020 – 26 April 2022 Magdalena Rzeczkowska
 12 May 2022 – present Bartosz Zbaraszczuk

References

External links

 Służba Celna (homepage)
 English version

Customs services
National law enforcement agencies of Poland
Specialist law enforcement agencies of Poland
Borders of Poland
Taxation in Poland
Polish intelligence agencies